Puntius masyai is a species of ray-finned fish in the genus Puntius. It is found in Mekong Basin.

References 

Puntius
Fish described in 1945